Wirral Women and Children's Hospital is located on the Arrowe Park Hospital campus, in Upton, Wirral, Merseyside and was founded following a redevelopment of the maternity and gynaecology wing of Arrowe Park Hospital. Although now considered a separate hospital, it remains managed by Wirral University Teaching Hospital NHS Foundation Trust.

History
The original maternity and gynaecology unit was opened by, and dedicated to, the Duchess of Westminster. Phased redevelopment work that would see the children's wards and outpatient department move from the main hospital building over to the maternity and gynaecology annexe began in 2009. In March 2011, the remodelled Wirral Women and Children's Hospital was officially reopened by the Countess of Wessex.

In 2012, the Wirral Women and Children's Hospital featured in the BBC Two documentary series The Midwives.

References

External links
Official site

Hospital buildings completed in 2011
Hospitals in Merseyside
Teaching hospitals in England
NHS hospitals in England